Mohammad Sadegh Amiri (born 1976) is an Iranian ethnobotanist, economic botanist, and pharmacognosist.

Early life and education 
Mohammad Sadegh Amiri was born in 1976 in Mashhad. He has a family history of more than 100 years in the field of medicinal plants in Mashhad.

Amiri received his bachelor's degree from Ferdowsi University of Mashhad in the field of plant sciences in 2000, his master's degree from the same university in the field of plant systematics, and his doctorate from the University of Guilan in the same field.

Career 
He is a professor in the Department of Botany at Payam Noor University.

Selected publications

Articles
 Eco-friendly and plant-based synthesis of silver nanoparticles using Allium giganteum and investigation of its bactericidal, cytotoxicity, and photocatalytic effects.
 Plant-based synthesis of cerium oxide nanoparticles using Rheum turkestanicum extract and evaluation of their cytotoxicity and photocatalytic properties.
 Green synthesis of nickel oxide nanoparticles using Salvia hispanica L. (chia) seeds extract and studies of their photocatalytic activity and cytotoxicity effects.
 Gum Tragacanth (GT): A Versatile Biocompatible Material beyond Borders.

References

Ferdowsi University of Mashad alumni
Academic staff of Payame Noor University
Ethnobotanists
Economic botanists
Pharmacognosists
Iranian botanists
1976 births
Living people